McCashney is a surname. Notable people with the surname include:

Ben McCashney (born 1988), Australian racing driver
Frank McCashney (born 1890), Australian rules footballer who played for the Richmond Football Club
Jim McCashney (born 1900), Australian rules footballer who played for the Hawthorn Football Club
John McCashney (footballer born 1884), Australian rules footballer who played for the South Melbourne Football Club
John McCashney (footballer born 1932), Australian rules footballer who played for the Hawthorn Football Club

Surnames